A Longford County Council election was held in County Longford in Ireland on 24 May 2019 as part of that year's local elections. All 18 councillors were elected for a five-year term of office from 3 local electoral areas (LEAs) by single transferable vote.

The 2018 LEA boundary review committee kept the LEAs used in the 2014 elections, adjusting their boundaries and transferring one seat from Granard to Longford LEA. The new boundaries were enacted by Statutory Instrument (SI) S.I. No. 625/2018.

The votes were counted in St. Mary's Community Centre, Edgeworthstown. Counting began on Saturday 25 May 25, and ended at 9.25pm on Tuesday 28 May when returning officer Nora O'Farrell declared the last 4 councillors to be elected in the Ballymahon LEA, where there had been a recount.

Results by party

Results by local electoral area

Ballymahon

Granard

Longford

Results by gender

Changes Since 2019 Local Elections
†Longford Fianna Fáil Cllr Joe Flaherty was elected as a Teachta Dála (TD) for Longford–Westmeath at the 2020 general election. Remu Adejinmi was co-opted to fill the vacancy.
††Granard Fine Gael Cllr Micheál Carrigy was elected to the Seanad in April 2020 on the Industrial and Commercial Panel. Colin Dalton was co-opted to fill the vacancy on 16 May 2020.

Footnotes

Sources

References

2019 Irish local elections
2019